The Shul of Bal Harbour is a Chabad-Lubavitch synagogue in Surfside, Florida named by Newsweek as one of America's 25 most vibrant congregations.

History
The Shul was founded by Rabbi Sholom Lipskar, who was sent as an emissary of the Chabad-Lubavitch Rebbe, Rabbi Menachem M. Schneersohn, to Miami Beach in 1969.

After finding no active Jewish community in the Surfside area, Lipskar initially met in hotel rooms before moving to a storefront.

In the early 1980s, Surfside was not welcoming to Jews with real-estate agents refusing to deal with Jewish clients. In 1982 the local Bal Harbor Club dropped its policy banning Jewish and Black people after a discrimination lawsuit.

The Shul moved to its current site in 1987.

Building
The $9 million, 34,000 square foot building was completed and opened in 1994 in time for Rosh Hashanah. The building is colonnaded and the design resembles  ancient Jerusalem sandstone.

Expansion
In 2016, The Shul announced a 40,000 square foot expansion at the cost of $20 million to be finished in two years. The expansion includes an all-glass wall 40 foot high social hall with glass ceilings accommodating crowds of up to 700 people.

Membership and services
The congregation membership has 700 families representing 3,000 people. Programming includes adult education, programs for Latin American Jewry, early childhood, and five daily minyans.

The Shul is also the headquarters for the Aleph Institute, an organization assisting Jewish prisoners and military personnel, also founded by Lipskar.

Surfside Condominium collapse
After the Surfside condominium collapse, The Shul raised over $500,000 for families of the victims and distributed aid to displaced community members.

References

External links
 

20th-century synagogues
Religious organizations established in 1981
Surfside, Florida
Synagogues completed in 1994